The ARBED building is the generally used name for the headquarters of ArcelorMittal and one of its predecessors, the ARBED steel manufacturing company, which was completed in 1922 on the Avenue de la Liberté, opposite the Rose Garden in Luxembourg City. The architect was the Frenchman René Théry, and construction was overseen by Sosthène Weis.

Description
The building stands on a plot of 59,37 acres, and contains 15,000 square-metres of usable space. When the building was opened, it also included salons, smoking rooms, conference rooms, a restaurant, a library, a ceremonial hall, a bowling lane and a gym. Its style is inspired by French châteaux of the 17th and 18th centuries. It was built of steel and reinforced concrete, but the façade is made of sandstone. Over the main entrance is a sculpture by René Rozet, which shows Victoria crowning Mercury, in the presence of an allegorical sculpture representing science. At their feet are coins and a cog, which symbolise the economic success of industry. Next to them are putti carrying a globe made of copper, a reference to the world-wide activity of business. Some sculptures on the façade are by Duilio Donzelli.

History

After ARBED emerged from World War I in a strong position, having bought some of the steel plants that Gelsenkirchener Hütten A.G. was forced to sell due to the German defeat, it quickly decided to build a new, grand HQ for their central administration. Its staff picked a spot in the railway quarter, along the axis between the Adolphe Bridge and the railway station. The French architect René Théry designed the building, and Sosthène Weis oversaw construction. After Théry's death in 1922, Weis continued work alone. It was inaugurated on 9 December 1922.

During the German occupation of Luxembourg during World War II, the Gauleiter Gustav Simon installed his headquarters in a wing of the building.

In 2002, ARBED merged with other European steel companies to form Arcelor, which in turn merged with Mittal Steel in 2006 to form ArcelorMittal, and the building changed ownership accordingly. ArcelorMittal no longer used the building as its headquarters, but used it for training. In November 2012 ArcelorMittal announced that it would not use the building from 2013, due to the high maintenance costs. A procedure was then started to have the building registered as a national monument. The city council consented to this on 28 January 2013, and registration was complete on 4 April 2013.

Though some members of the Chamber of Deputies expressed concern over the fate of the iconic building, suggesting it could house a public cultural institution in future, the government declared on 20 April 2013 it had no intention of purchasing the building, citing the state's financial constraints.

Notes

Further reading 
 Robert L. Philippart: "Le palais de l'ARBED."  in: forum Nr. 304, February 2011, p. 21-23.
 Antoinette Lorang: ARBED, le siège social, une architecture reflet du dynamisme de l'entreprise. Luxembourg 2000.

Buildings and structures in Luxembourg City
Office buildings completed in 1922
1922 establishments in Luxembourg